Óliver Laxe Coro (born 11 April 1982) is a French-born Spanish film director, screenwriter and actor of Galician ancestry. His debut feature film You All Are Captains premiered at the 2010 Cannes Film Festival, where it won the FIPRESCI Prize. His third film Fire Will Come was screened in the Un Certain Regard section at the 2019 Cannes Film Festival, where it won the Jury Prize.

Early life
Laxe was born in Paris, the son of Galician emigrants.  In 1988, at the age of six, he went back with them to Galicia. After completing his  secondary education in A Coruña he moved to Barcelona where he studied filmmaking at the Pompeu Fabra University, before relocating to London where he filmed his first short Y las chimeneas decidieron escapar.

Career
His debut feature film You All Are Captains premiered at the 2010 Cannes Film Festival, where it won the FIPRESCI Prize. His next film Mimosas was shot in the Atlas Mountains. It was screened at the 2016 Cannes Film Festival as part of the International Critics' Week section, where it won the Nespresso Grand Prize. The project had been developed through TorinoFilmLab Interchange programme in 2011.

Filmography

References

External links
 

1982 births
Living people
Male actors from Galicia (Spain)
Film directors from Galicia (Spain)
Spanish film directors
Spanish male screenwriters
Spanish male film actors
Film directors from Paris
Male actors from Paris
Pompeu Fabra University alumni
21st-century Spanish male actors
21st-century Spanish screenwriters